What The--?! is a Marvel Comics comic book series self-parodying the Marvel Universe, similar in vein to the 1960s series Not Brand Echh. It was billed as "The Marvel mag of mirth and mayhem!" The series ran for 26 issues, from August 1988 through Winter 1993, with issue #26 being a Fall Special. It typically contained a series of short stories with comedic takes on Marvel heroes and villains, such as having Spider-Ham substitute for Spider-Man.

Concept
What The--?! spotlighted some of the top artists and writers at the time. Many, such as Stan Lee and John Byrne, contributed works that spoof some of their all-time greatest successes. For example, in issue #2, Byrne creates a tale pitting his work on the Fantastic Four franchise against his work with Superman. The issue goes so far as to have the Lex Luthor character complain about the changes Byrne made to the Superman legend after DC Comics' Crisis on Infinite Earths.

Though it carried the Marvel Comics label on the front left corner, What The--?! touted itself as being published by "Marble Comics". What The--?! parodied Marvel institutions such as the legendary Marvel Comics fan mail page, with staged articles called "The Marble Mailbag" and the "What The...Mail". The title also did not contain any "true" advertisements. Instead, What The--?! hosted a number of fake advertisements that made fun of classic comic book advertisements such as Charles Atlas, novelty by-mail companies, and the Hostess snack food ads of the 1970s and 1980s.

History
What The--?! was originally published as a four-issue limited series. The last issue closed with an appeal from Fred Hembeck for readers to write to Marvel if they wanted to see more of the comic book. Several months later, What The--?! returned, resuming its numbering at issue #5.

Marvel.com has a web series called "Marvel Superheroes: What the--?!", mainly featuring MODOK and Deadpool.

List of What The--?! issues

External links

Marvel Comics titles
1988 comics debuts
1993 comics endings
Marvel Comics parodies
Comics by Don McGregor
Comics by Kurt Busiek
Defunct American comics